San Pedro de las Dueñas is a locality and minor local entity located in the municipality of Sahagún, in León province, Castile and León, Spain. As of 2020, it has a population of 56.

Geography 
San Pedro de las Dueñas is located 62km east-southeast of León, Spain.

References

Populated places in the Province of León